Razorback Developments was a British video games developer that specialised in creating handheld games.  Founded in 2003 by David Leitch, Jeff Tawney, Cameron Sheppard and Chris Walsh, Razorback was set up initially to create a series of licensed games on the Nintendo GBA for the publisher THQ.  It then focused on developing a collection of licensed and original games for the Nintendo DS.

The studio created 12 titles in total, across various handheld formats.  It was nominated for the “Best Handheld Games Studio” in the 2006 Develop Industry Excellence Awards.

The company ceased trading in March 2012.

Games created by Razorback Developments

 Hot Wheels: Stunt Track Challenge (published by THQ on GBA) – 2004
 Lego Knights' Kingdom (published by THQ on GBA) – 2004
 Bionicle: Maze of Shadows (published by THQ on GBA) – 2005
 Fairly Odd Parents: Clash With The Anti-World (published by THQ on GBA) – 2005
 Alex Rider: Stormbreaker (published by THQ on GBA) – 2006
 Warhammer 40,000: Glory in Death (published by THQ on N-Gage) – 2006
 Xiaolin Showdown (published by Konami/Warner Bros on DS) – 2007
 Dr Reiner Knizia's Brainbenders (known in the US as Brain Voyage) (published by Eidos on DS) – 2008
 Bella Sara (published by Codemasters on DS) – 2008
 The Chase: Felix meets Felicity (published by Atari on DS) – 2009
 Dragonology (published by Codemasters on DS) – 2009
 Tap & Teach: The Story of Noah's Ark (published by Southpeak on DS) – 2010

References 

Video game development companies
Video game companies established in 2003
Video game companies disestablished in 2012
Defunct video game companies of the United Kingdom